The Smith & Wesson Model 3000 is a pump-action shotgun offered by Smith & Wesson during the 1970s and 1980s. The shotguns were manufactured in Japan by Howa Machinery.

History
The Model 3000 was available in 12 and 20 gauge, chambering  shotshells. A "slug gun" variant chambered for -inch shells with a magazine extension and a shorter barrel was offered in 12 gauge only, with optional open sights.

Sportsman and tactical versions were produced; the tactical versions were used by some American police departments. Like the semi-automatic Model 1000 that was offered during the same era, the Model 3000 was sold for a short time by Mossberg after it was discontinued by Smith & Wesson.

References

External links
 S&W 3000 Pump Shotgun in 12 gauge via YouTube
 S&W model 3000 with Speedfeed stock via YouTube
 S&W 3000 Shotgun Review (tactical version) via YouTube

Smith & Wesson firearms
Pump-action shotguns
Police weapons